Music & Friends is Cafêzz' debut album, released in 2014. The album includes 14 compositions from Puerto Rican pianist Carmen Noemí. The band's style is very eclectic, embracing a wide array of Brazilian, Caribbean, jazz, rock, Latin, folk, and classical influences.

The music is organized in two parts, or playlists, and most of the compositions are allusive to coffee themes. The first seven tracks are relaxed and pleasant, like a "latte coffee", while tracks 8 thru 14 are lively and exciting, as an "espresso".

Even though it includes elements from jazz, its performance is not focused on individual instrument virtuosity, but rely on the ensemble's communication and interaction. There's ample melodic content combined with tasty rhythms, giving the listener rich sound textures to enjoy with ease.

Tracks

All songs composed and arranged by Carmen Noemí (ASCAP)

Latte Mood

 A Little Coffee  4:32
 Waterfalls       6:14
 De Paseo...      4:57
 Barco De Papel   4:51
 Por La Vereda    5:21
 Luna Gris        5:04
 Mis Recuerdos    3:37

Espresso Mood

 Cafe Colao      5:12
 Mocha Samba     5:13
 Mr. Flat Ninth  4:32
 Piña Colada     5:10
 Espresso Jam    5:12
 Coffee Break!   4:17
 De Paseo (Trio) 3:07

Personnel

 Carmen Noemí - piano and keyboards
 Edgardo ‘Egui’ Sierra - electric fretted and fretless basses, Navarro pickups and basses
 Christian Nieves - Puerto Rican cuatro
 Ariana González - Puerto Rican cuatro
 Ricardo Pons – flute
 Pedro Rivera Toledo - alto sax
 Edgardo G. Sierra - alto sax
 Norberto "Tiko" Ortiz - tenor sax
 José Roberto Jiménez - tenor sax
 Roberto Bermúdez - tenor sax
 Rafael "El indio" Martínez - baritone sax
 Raúl Maldonado - drums, bongos, darbouka
 Danny Lloret - drums
 Arnaldo Rivera – drums
 Marlene Grafals - drums, bongos
 Paoli Mejías – congas
 Christian Galíndez - congas, bongos, percussion
 Errol Oliver - percussion
 Mónika Nieves - güiro
 Osvaldo López - electric guitar
 Ricardo Lugo - electric bass
 Angélika Kolsan - electric bass
 Ismael Rodríguez - rhodes piano
 Renaldo Guadalupe - acoustic guitar

Produced, recorded and mixed by Edgardo Sierra

Recorded at EdS Music Recording Studio, San Juan, PR; and Inter Metro Recording Studio, San Juan, PR

Mastering engineer: David Rodríguez

Mastered at Digital Recording Services, Levitown, PR

Reviews and articles
 All About Jazz Magazine - 5 Star Review by James Nadal
 In January 2015, Cafêzz' Music & Friends was included on National Foundation for Popular Culture's Top 20 Outstanding Recordings of 2014 produced in Puerto Rico.
 El Nuevo Día - Zafra Musical sin Precedentes
 Caribe Jazz Magazine - Interview
 Coffee Lovers Magazine - Music & Interview: Cafêzz Music & Friends
 El Nuevo Día - Una Combinación Perfecta
 Caribe Jazz Magazine - CD Review by Wilbert Sostre
 El Nuevo Día - Despierta los Sentidos como el Café

References

2014 debut albums
Cafêzz albums